Ashleigh Aston Moore (November 13, 1981 – December 10, 2007) was an American child actress who played Chrissy in the 1995 film Now and Then.

Life and career
Born Ashley Rogers in Sunnyvale, California, she began acting at the age of four. After appearing in numerous commercials, she landed the dual roles of Alpha and Donna in the CBC Television children's series The Odyssey in 1992. The show lasted three seasons, ending in 1994 with 39 episodes. Moore's best known role was in the 1995 coming-of-age ensemble comedy-drama film Now and Then. Set in 1970, Moore portrayed the child version of Christina "Chrissy" Dewitt who was portrayed as an adult by Rita Wilson.

She later guest starred on popular television shows such as Madison, Northern Exposure, and Strange Luck.

On December 10, 2007, Moore died in British Columbia, Canada from an accidental heroin overdose.

Filmography

Awards and nominations

References

External links

1981 births
2007 deaths
20th-century Canadian actresses
Actresses from California
American expatriate actresses in Canada
Canadian child actresses
Canadian television actresses
Canadian film actresses
People from Sunnyvale, California
Drug-related deaths in Canada
Accidental deaths in British Columbia
20th-century American women
20th-century American people
21st-century American women